Gong County or Gongxian is a county located in southern Sichuan Province, China. It is under the administration of Yibin city. It is mainly known to travelers for the hanging coffins, a site which dates back nearly 3,000 years and is attributed to the Bo people, who died out around 400 years ago.

Hanging coffins of Bo people
Hanging coffins carved from a single log are found in the areas once inhabited by Bo people (China).

Climate

Notable people
Chang Xiangyu

References

County-level divisions of Sichuan
Counties and districts of Yibin